Antarctica is one of the most physically and chemically extreme terrestrial environments to be inhabited by lifeforms. The largest plants are mosses, and the largest animals that do not leave the continent are a few species of insects.

Climate and habitat
Although most of the continent is covered by glacial ice sheets, ice-free areas comprising approximately 0.4% of the continental land mass are discontinuously distributed around the coastal margins.  The McMurdo Dry Valleys region of Antarctica is a polar desert characterized by extremely low annual precipitation  and an absence of vascular plants and vertebrates; microbial activity dominates biological functioning.  Mean summer high and winter low temperatures in the dry valleys are  Because precipitation is both infrequent and low, seasonal water availability in hydrologically connected soils make areas adjacent to water bodies more hospitable relative to dry upland soils.  Polar ecosystems are particularly sensitive to climate change, where small changes in temperature result in greater changes in local hydrology, dramatically affecting ecosystem processes.

Soils in Antarctica are nearly two-dimensional habitats, with most biological activity limited to the top four or five inches by the permanently frozen ground below.  Environments can be limiting due to soil properties such as unfavorable mineralogy, texture, structure, salts, pH, or moisture relationships.  Visible sources of organic matter are absent for most of continental Antarctica.  Dry Valley soil ecosystems are characterized by large variations in temperature and light regimes, steep chemical gradients and a high incidence of solar radiation with an elevated ultraviolet B (UVB) light component.  Dry Valley soils originate from weathering of bedrock and glacial tills that consist of granites, sandstones, basalts and metamorphic rocks.  Space within these rocks provide protection for microorganisms against some (but not all) of these conditions: i.e., protection from wind scouring and surface mobility, a reduction in UV exposure, reduced desiccation and enhanced water availability, and thermal buffering.  Half of the soils in the Dry Valleys have subsurface ice, either as buried massive ice or as ice-cemented soil (permafrost).  The permafrost layer is typically within  of the soil surface.

Microorganisms overview
The harsh environment and low availability of carbon and water support a simplified community of mosses, lichens, and mats of green algae and red, orange, and black cyanobacteria near lakes and ephemeral streams.  Living among the mats are bacteria, yeasts, molds, and an array of microscopic invertebrates that feed on microbes, algae, and detritus: nematodes, protozoa, rotifers, tardigrades, and occasionally, mites and springtails.  Even simpler communities exist in the arid soils that occupy the majority of the landscape.

Microbes in Antarctica adapt to aridity the same way microbes in hot deserts do: when water becomes scarce, the organisms simply dry up, shut down metabolic activity, and wait in a cryptobiotic state until water again becomes available.  Microbes can also go dormant in a cryptobiotic state known as anhydrobiosis when they become dehydrated due to low water availability.  A more extreme survival method would be long term natural cryopreservation.  Samples of permafrost sediments aged 5–10 thousand to 2–3 million years old have been found to contain viable micromycete and bacterial cells.

Algae
Algae is present in almost all ice-free areas and occurs in soils, as epiphytes on mosses, in cyanobacterial mats and in plankton of lakes and ponds.  It is also possible to find algae associated with rocks or living in the thin film of melted water in the snow patches.  Presently there are over 300 algal taxa identified on Antarctica, with Bacillariophyceae (Diatoms) and Chlorophyta (Green algae) being the most widespread on Antarctica.  Diatoms are abundant in aquatic environments decreasing in number in terrestrial habitats.  Chlorophyta are also important in mats in lakes and ponds but tend to increase their relative importance in terrestrial environments and especially in soils, where they are the densest algal group.  Xanthophyceae (Yellow-green algae) are an important component of the flora in soils of Antarctica.  Other algal groups (Dinophyta, Cryptophyta, and Euglenophyta) are mainly limited to freshwater communities of the Dry Valleys.

Algae species identified in recent research:

Hantzschia amphioxys
Heterococcus moniliformis
Kentrosphaera facciolae
Luticola desmetii
Luticola doliiformis
Luticola evkae
Luticola muticopsis
Luticola permuticopsis
Luticola tomsui
Monodus coccomyxa
Pinnularia borealis
Prasiola crispa
Xanthonema bristolianum
Xanthonema exile

Animals

Arthropods
Distribution of arthropods is limited to areas of high soil moisture and/or access to water, such as streams, or snow meltwater.

Nematodes
Carbon appears to be more important than moisture in defining good habitats for nematodes in the Dry Valleys of Antarctica.  Scottnema lindsayae, a microbial feeder and the most abundant and widely distributed metazoan invertebrate, often occurs as the sole metazoan species in the McMurdo Dry Valleys.  It makes its living eating bacteria and yeast out in the dry, salty soils that dominate the valleys.  All other invertebrate species are more abundant in moist or saturated soils where algae and moss are more abundant.  Distribution of most nematode species is correlated negatively with elevation (due to temperature and precipitation) and salinity, and positively with soil moisture, soil organic matter, and nutrient availability.  Eudorylaimus spp. is the second most abundant nematode, followed by Plectus murrayi who are the least abundant nematodes.  Plectus antarcticus eats bacteria and prefers living in ephemeral streams.  An average 2-pound bag of dry valley soils contains approximately 700 nematodes, while the more fertile soil found at higher latitudes on the continent may contain approximately 4,000 nematodes.

Nematode species identified in recent research:

Amblydorylaimus isokaryon
Antarctenchus hooperi
Aphelenchoides hagueri
Aphelenchoides helicosoma
Aphelenchoides vaughani
Calcaridorylaimus signatus
Ceratoplectus armatus
Chiloplacoides antarcticus
Chiloplectus masleni
Coomansus gerlachei
Cuticularia firmata
Ditylenchus spp.
Ditylenchus parcevivens
Enchodelus signyensis
Eudorylaimus spp.
Eudorylaimus antarcticus
Eudorylaimus coniceps
Eudorylaimus glacialis
Eudorylaimus nudicaudatus
Eudorylaimus pseudocarteri
Eudorylaimus shirasei
Eudorylaimus spaulli
Eudorylaimus verrucosus
Eumonhystera vulgaris
Eutobrilus antarcticus
Geomonhystera antarcticola
Geomonhystera villosa
Mesodorylaimus spp.
Mesodorylaimus imperator
Mesodorylaimus signatus
Monhystera spp.
Panagrolaimus spp.
Panagrolaimus davidi
Panagrolaimus magnivulvatus
Paramphidelus spp.
Paramphidelus antarcticus
Plectus spp.
Plectus accuminatus
Plectus antarcticus
Plectus belgicae
Plectus frigophilus
Plectus insolens
Plectus meridianus
Plectus murrayi
Plectus tolerans
Rhabdblaimus spp.
Rhabditis krylovi
Rhyssocolpus paradoxus
Rotylenchus capensis
Scottnema lindsayae
Teratocephalus pseudolirellus
Teratocephalus rugosus
Teratocephalus tilbrooki
Tylenchus spp.

Rotifers
The three species listed below were found in moss-dominated moist soils.

Rotifer species identified in recent research:

Epiphanes spp.
Habrotrocha spp.
Philodina spp.

Tardigrades
Tardigrade species identified in recent research:

Acutuncus antarcticus
Diphascon spp. (form. Adropoion spp.)
Diphascon alpinum
Diphascon dastychi
Diphascon polare
Diphascon tricuspidatum (form. Adropion tricuspidatum)
Diphascon victoriae
Hypsibius spp. (form. Diphascon spp.)
Hypsibius alpinus
Hypsibius arcticus
Hypsibius cfr mertoni simoizumii
Hypsibius convergens
Hypsibius oberhaeseri
Hypsibius scoticus (form. Diphascon scoticus)
Macrobiotus arcticus
Macrobiotus cfr polaris
Macrobiotus mottai
Macrobiotus oberhauseri
Macrobiotus polaris
Minibiotus furcatus
Ramajendas frigidus
Ramazzottius spp.
Ramazzottius oberhauseri

Bacteria
Typically, the highest numbers of cultured bacteria are from relatively moist coastal soils, compared with the small bacteria communities of dry inland soils.  Cyanobacteria are found in all types of aquatic habitats and often dominate the microbial biomass of streams and lake sediments.  Leptolyngbya frigida is dominant in benthic mats, and is frequently found in soils and as an epiphyte on mosses.  Nostoc commune can develop to sizes visible to the naked eye if supplied with a thin water film.  The genus Gloeocapsa is one of the few cryptoendolithic taxa with a high adaptation to extreme environmental conditions in rocks of the Dry Valleys.  Actinomycetota such as Arthrobacter spp., Brevibacterium spp., and Corynebacterium spp. are prominent in the Dry Valleys.  Thermophilic bacteria have been isolated from thermally heated soils near Mt. Melbourne and Mt. Rittman in northern Victoria Land.  Bacteria genera found in both air samples and the Antarctic include Staphylococcus, Bacillus, Corynebacterium, Micrococcus, Streptococcus, Neisseria, and Pseudomonas. Bacteria were also found living in the cold and dark in a lake buried a half-mile deep under the ice in Antarctica.

Bacteria species identified in recent research:

Acinetobacter spp.
Alicyclobacillus acidocaldarius
Aquaspirillum spp.
Arthrobacter spp.
Azospirillum spp.
Bacillus spp.
Bacillus fumarioli
Bacillus thermoantarcticus
Bizionia argentinensis
Brevibacterium spp.
Brevibacterium antarcticum
Brevundimonas spp.
Chryseobacterium spp.
Corynebacterium spp.
Flavobacterium spp.
Gloeocapsa spp.
Hymenobacter roseosalivarius
Leptolyngbya frigida
Massila spp.
Micrococcus spp.
Modestobacter multiseptatus
Neisseria spp.
Nocardia spp.
Nostoc commune
Paenibacillus spp.
Planococcus spp.
Pseudonocardia antarctica
Pseudomonas spp.
Psychrobacter spp.
Sphingobacterium spp.
Staphylococcus spp.
Stenotrophomonas spp.
Streptococcus spp.
Streptomyces spp.

Fungi
Chaetomium gracile is frequently isolated from geothermally heated soil on Mt. Melbourne in northern Victoria Land.  Fungi genera found in both air samples and the Antarctic include Penicillium, Aspergillus, Cladosporium, Alternaria, Aureobasidium, Botryotrichum, Botrytis, Geotrichum, Staphylotrichum, Paecilomyces, and Rhizopus.

Fungi species identified in recent research:

Alternaria spp.
Antarctomyces psychotrophicus
Arthrobotrys ferox
Aspergillus spp.
Aspergillus ustus
Aureobasidium spp.
Botryotrichum spp.
Botrytis spp.
Chaetomium gracile
Cadophora ssp.
Cadophora malorum
Cerrena unicolor
Cladosporium spp.
Cladosporium cladosporioides
Cladosporium herbarum
Cochliobolus heliconiae
Coniochaeta ligniaria
Curvularia inaequalis
Debaryomyces ssp.
Debaryomyces hansenii
Geomyces spp.
Geomyces pannorum (form. Chrysosporium pannorum)
Geotrichum spp.
Hohenbuehelia spp.
Holwaya mucida
Mortierella antarctica
Mucor hiemalis
Paecilomyces spp.
Penicillium spp.
Penicillium jensenii
Penicillium swiecickii
Phaeosphaeria spp.
Phialophora spp.
Phialophora fastigiata (form. Cadophora fastigiata)
Phoma spp.
Phoma herbarum
Rhizopus spp.
Rhizoscyphus ericae
Staphylotrichum spp.
Stereum hirsutum
Stictis radiata
Thelebolus microsporus
Trichophyton eboreum

Yeast
Yeast species identified in recent research:

Aureobasidium pullulans
Candida spp.
Candida psychrophilia
Species formerly referred to Cryptococcus 
Naganishia albida
Vishniacozyma foliicola
Vishniacozyma victoriae
Naganishia vishniacii
Debaryomyces hansenii
Leucosporidium antarcticum
Leucosporidium scottii
Rhodotorula spp.
Rhodotorula laryngis
Rhodotorula minuta
Rhodotorula rubra
Rhodotorula slooffiae
Trichosporon spp.
Trichosporon beigelii
Trichosporon cutaneum

Protozoa
The small amoebae are of two types.  The most abundant are Acanthamoeba and Echinamoeba.  The second group consists of monopodal, worm-like amoebae, the subcylindrical Hartmannella and Saccamoeba, and the lingulate Platyamoeba stenopodia Page.

Amoebae species identified in recent research:

Acanthamoeba spp.
Echinamoeba spp.
Hartmannella spp.
Platyamoeba stenopodia
Saccamoeba spp.

Flagellate species identified in recent research:

Bodo edax
Bodo mutabilis
Bodo saltans
Heteromita globosa
Oikomonas termo

References

External links
 Australian Antarctic Data Centre

 

Environment of Antarctica
Polyextremophiles